Maraachli literally coming from Marash (presently Kahramanmaraş) in Turkey, may refer to:

Marashli Ali Pasha, an Ottoman governor, serving as the Vizier of Belgrade (Sanjak of Smederevo) in ca. 1815
Ibrahim Maraachli, Lebanese stage, radio and television actor and comedian
Mona Maraachli (1958-2016), Lebanese singer 
Joseph Maraachli case, an international controversy over the life of Joseph Maraachli, commonly known as Baby Joseph, a Canadian infant

See also
Marash (disambiguation)
Kahramanmaraş